Tears of White Roses is the debut album by Sebastien, melodic power metal band from Czech Republic, released in 2010.

Track listing
All songs written by George Rain & Andy Mons
All lyrics written by Jan Petričko

 "Museé Du Satan Rouge" - 3:47
 "Femme Fatale" - 4:15
 "Dorian" - 4:14
 "Remiel in Flames" - 4:09
 "Tears of White Roses" - 4:03
 "Phoenix Rising" - 3:27
 "Voices in Your Heart" - 3:28
 "Fields of Chlum (1866 A.D.)" - 4:33
 "Lake of Dreams" - 3:49
 "Silver Water" - 5:02
 "Black Rose - part I" - 3:14
 "Black Rose - part II" - 2:56

Band info

Band members
George Rain - vocals, guitars
Andy Mons - guitars
Petri Skalainen - bass
Victor Mazanek - keyboards
Radek Rain - drums

Guest musicians
Amanda Somerville - vocal
Apollo Papathanasio - vocal
Doogie White - vocal
Fabio Lione - vocal
Mike DiMeo - vocal
Roland Grapow - guitar, vocal
Tore Moren - guitar

Production
Produced by Roland Grapow
Engineered and mixed by Roland Grapow at Grapow Studios in Zvolenská Slatina, Slovakia.
Cover art and logo design: DisArt Design

References

2010 debut albums
Sebastien (band) albums